The National Museum of the American Indian is a museum in the United States devoted to the culture of the indigenous peoples of the Americas. It is part of the Smithsonian Institution group of museums and research centers.

The museum has three facilities. The National Museum of the American Indian on the National Mall in Washington, D.C., opened on September 21, 2004, on Fourth Street and Independence Avenue, Southwest. The George Gustav Heye Center, a permanent museum, is located at the Alexander Hamilton U.S. Custom House in New York City, opened in October of 1994. The Cultural Resources Center, a research and collections facility, is located in Suitland, Maryland.  The foundations for the present collections were first assembled in the former Museum of the American Indian in New York City, which was established in 1916, and which became part of the Smithsonian in 1989.

On January 20, 2022, the museum announced Cynthia Chavez Lamar as its new director. Her first day in this position was February 14, 2022.

History
Following controversy over the discovery by Indian leaders that the Smithsonian Institution held more than 12,000–18,000 Indian remains, mostly in storage, United States Senator Daniel Inouye introduced in 1989 the National Museum of the American Indian Act. Passed as Public Law 101-185, it established the National Museum of the American Indian as "a living memorial to Native Americans and their traditions". The Act also required that human remains, funerary objects, sacred objects, and objects of cultural patrimony be considered for repatriation to tribal communities, as well as objects acquired illegally. Since 1989 the Smithsonian has repatriated over 5,000 individual remains – about 1/3 of the total estimated human remains in its collection.

On September 21, 2004, for the inauguration of the Museum, Senator Inouye addressed an audience of around 20,000 American Indians, Alaska Natives, and Native Hawaiians, which was the largest gathering in Washington D.C. of indigenous people to its time.

The creation of the museum brought together the collections of the George Gustav Heye Center in New York City, founded in 1922, and the Smithsonian Institution. The Heye collection became part of the Smithsonian in June 1990, and represents approximately 85% of the holdings of the NMAI. The Heye Collection was formerly displayed at Audubon Terrace in Uptown Manhattan, but had long been seeking a new building.

The Museum of the American Indian considered options of merging with the Museum of Natural History, accepting a large donation from Ross Perot to be housed in a new museum building to be built in Dallas, or moving to the U.S. Customs House. The Heye Trust included a restriction requiring the collection to be displayed in New York City, and moving the collection to a Museum outside of New York aroused substantial opposition from New York politicians. The current arrangement represented a political compromise between those who wished to keep the Heye Collection in New York, and those who wanted it to be part of the new NMAI in Washington, DC. The NMAI was initially housed in lower Manhattan at the Alexander Hamilton U.S. Custom House, which was refurbished for this purpose and remains an exhibition site; its building on the Mall in Washington, DC opened on September 21, 2004.

Locations

The museum of American Indian has three branches: National Museum of the American Indian in the National Mall (Washington, D.C.), George Gustav Heye Center in New York City, and the Cultural Resources Center in Maryland.

National Mall (Washington, D.C.)

The groundbreaking ceremony for the National Museum of the American Indian on the National Mall was held on September 28, 1999. The museum opened on September 21, 2004. 

Fifteen years in the making, it was the first national museum in the country dedicated exclusively to Native Americans. The five-story, curvilinear building is clad in a golden-colored Kasota limestone designed to evoke natural rock formations shaped by wind and water over thousands of years.

The museum is set in a -site and is surrounded by simulated wetlands. Similar to the Heye Center in Lower Manhattan, the museum offers a range of exhibitions, film and video screenings, school group programs, public programs and living culture presentations throughout the year.

The museum's architect and project designer is Canadian Douglas Cardinal (Blackfoot); its design architects are GBQC Architects of Philadelphia and architect Johnpaul Jones (Cherokee/Choctaw). Disagreements during construction led to Cardinal's being removed from the project, but the building retains his original design intent. He provided continued input during the museum's construction. The structural engineering firm chosen for this project was Severud Associates.

The museum's project architects are Jones & Jones Architects and Landscape Architects Ltd. of Seattle and SmithGroup of Washington, D.C., in association with Lou Weller (Caddo), the Native American Design Collaborative, and Polshek Partnership Architects of New York City; Ramona Sakiestewa (Hopi) and Donna House (Navajo/Oneida) also served as design consultants. The landscape architects are Jones & Jones Architects and Landscape Architects Ltd. of Seattle and EDAW, Inc., of Alexandria, Virginia.

In general, Native Americans have filled the leadership roles in the design and operation of the museum and have aimed at creating a different atmosphere and experience from museums of European and Euro-American culture. Donna E. House, the Navajo and Oneida botanist who supervised the landscaping, has said, "The landscape flows into the building, and the environment is who we are. We are the trees, we are the rocks, we are the water. And that had to be part of the museum." This theme of organic flow is reflected by the interior of the museum, whose walls are mostly curving surfaces, with almost no sharp corners.

The Mitsitam Native Foods Cafe has five stations serving different regional foods: Northern Woodlands, South America, the Northwest Coast, Meso-America, and the Great Plains. Mitsitam’s first Executive Chef was the Diné chef Freddie Bitsoie. The museum has published a Mitisam Cafe Cookbook.

George Gustav Heye Center (New York City)

George Gustav Heye (1874–1957) traveled throughout North and South America collecting native objects. His collection was assembled over 54 years, beginning in 1903. He started the Museum of the American Indian and his Heye Foundation in 1916. The Heye Foundation's Museum of the American Indian opened to the public on Audubon Terrace in New York City in 1922.

The museum at Audubon Terrace closed in 1994 and part of the collection is now housed at The Museum's George Gustav Heye Center, that occupies two floors of the Alexander Hamilton U.S. Custom House in Lower Manhattan. The Beaux Arts-style building, designed by architect Cass Gilbert, was completed in 1907. It is a designated National Historic Landmark and a New York City landmark. The Heye Center offers a range of exhibitions, film and video screenings, school group programs and living culture presentations throughout the year.

Cultural Resources Center (Maryland)
In Suitland, Maryland, the National Museum of the American Indian operates the Cultural Resources Center, an enormous, nautilus-shaped building which houses the collection, a library, and the photo archives. The Cultural Resources Center opened in 2003.

Collection

The National Museum of the American Indian is home to the collection of the former Museum of the American Indian, Heye Foundation. The collection includes more than 800,000 objects, as well as a photographic archive of 125,000 images. It is divided into the following areas: Amazon; Andes; Arctic/Subarctic; California/Great Basin; Contemporary Art; Mesoamerican/Caribbean; Northwest Coast; Patagonia; Plains/Plateau; Woodlands.

The collection, which became part of the Smithsonian in June 1990, was assembled by George Gustav Heye (1874–1957) during a 54-year period, beginning in 1903. He traveled throughout North and South America collecting Native objects.  Heye used his collection to found New York's Museum of the American Indian, Heye Foundation and directed it until his death in 1957. The Heye Foundation's Museum of the American Indian opened to the public in New York City in 1922.

The collection is not subject to the Native American Graves Protection and Repatriation Act. When the National Museum was created in 1989, a law governing repatriation was drafted specifically for the museum, the National Museum of the American Indian Act, upon which NAGPRA was modeled. In addition to repatriation, the museum dialogues with tribal communities regarding the appropriate curation of cultural heritage items. For example, the human remains vault is smudged once a week with tobacco, sage, sweetgrass, and cedar, and sacred Crow objects in the Plains vault are smudged with sage during the full moon. If the appropriate cultural tradition for curating an object is unknown, the Native staff uses their own cultural knowledge and customs to treat materials as respectfully as possible.

The museum has programs in which Native American scholars and artists can view NMAI's collections to enhance their own research and artwork.

Nation to Nation: Treaties
In 2014 NMAI opened  a new exhibition Nation to Nation: Treaties, curated by Indian rights activist Suzan Shown Harjo. The exhibit is built around the Two Row Wampum Treaty, known from both Indian oral tradition and a written document that some believe is a modern forgery. Museum reviewer Diana Muir Appelbaum has said, "There is no evidence that there ever was a 1613 treaty" and describes NMAI as "a museum that peddles fairy tales."

Reception
The National Museum of the American Indian has been criticized occasionally for a perceived disjointedness of its exhibits. Two Washington Post reviews on the museum were hostile at the representation of American Indians. Two writers, Fisher and Richard, expressed "irritation and frustration at the cognitive dissonance they experienced once inside the museum". Fisher expected the displays that depicted the clash between foreign colonists and the native people. The exhibit lacked a trace of Indians' evolution from centuries of life on this land, and gave little information as to the history of their survival. He concludes, "The museum feels like a trade show in which each group of Indians gets space to sell its founding myth and favorite anecdotes of survival. Each room is a sales booth of its own, separate, out of context, gathered in a museum that adds to the balkanization of a society that seems ever more ashamed of the unity and purpose that sustained it over two centuries". Richards, who also had a similar assessment of the NMAI, begins his criticism by observing that he found the exhibits to be confusing and unclearly marked. To him, the exhibits were full with a mixture of "totem poles and T-shirts, headdresses and masks, toys and woven baskets, projectile points and gym shoes". According to him, the items were presented in a hodgepodge that displayed history in an incoherent demonstration.

Jacki Thompson Rand, a Choctaw historian who served on the advisory board up to 1994, titled her reflections Why I Can't Visit the National Museum of the American Indian:  "The absence of Native knowledge and the consequent inability to effect the required translation undermined exhibitions … Art and material culture were the preferred media for transferring knowledge about Native America to an unknowing audience. Why art and culture? … This meant, astonishingly, no treatment of the history of genocide and colonialism, then and now, or even of the basis of tribal sovereignty."

Edward Rothstein described the NMAI as an "identity museum" that "jettisons Western scholarship and tells its own story, leading one tribe to solemnly describe its earliest historical milestone: "Birds teach people to call for rain"; similarly, Diana Muir accused the curators of going "with verve and confidence to a place where subjective personal narrative is privileged above factual evidence, and the deliberate myth-making of an active national revival trumps scholarship."

The museum had 2.4 million visitors in the year it opened. In 2014 it averaged 1.4 million visitors; Peggy McGlone of the Washington Post wrote at the time that it was "best known for its cafeteria", and described it as "remarkably empty" of visitors, attributing this to exhibits that feel "disjointed and incomplete."

Directors
In January 2022, the Smithsonian announced that Cynthia Chavez Lamar, a current employee since 2014, would take over as director of NMAI on February 14. Her position will also oversee the George Gustav Heye Center in Lower Manhattan and the Cultural Resources Center in Suitland, Maryland. As an enrolled member at San Felipe Pueblo, she will be the first Native American woman to serve as a Smithsonian museum director. Previously, she was NMAI's acting associate director for collections and operations, and had also interned at the museum in 1994, and worked there as an associate curator from 2000 to 2005.

Before Chavez Lamar, Machel Monenerkit had been the Acting Director, taking the position in January 2021. Kathy Hopinkah Hannan, CPA PhD, currently serves as the Chairman of the Board of Trustees for the Smithsonian Institution's National Museum of the American Indian.

Kevin Gover was the director of the Smithsonian Institution's National Museum of the American Indian beginning December 2007 until January 2021. He is currently the Under Secretary for Museums and Culture at the Smithsonian. He is a former professor of law at the Sandra Day O'Connor College of Law at Arizona State University in Tempe, an affiliate professor in its American Indian Studies Program and co-executive director of the university's American Indian Policy Institute. Gover, 52, grew up in Oklahoma and is a member of the Pawnee Nation of Oklahoma and of Comanche descent. He received his bachelor's degree in public and international affairs from Princeton University and his J.D. degree from the University of New Mexico School of Law. He was awarded an honorary doctor of laws degree from Princeton University in 2001.

Gover succeeded W. Richard West Jr. (Southern Cheyenne), who was the founding director of the National Museum of the American Indian (1990–2007).

West was strongly criticized in 2007 for having spent $250,000 on travel in four years and being away from the museum frequently on overseas travel. This was official travel funded by the Smithsonian, and many within the Native American community offered defenses of West and his tenure.

American Indian magazine

The museum publishes a quarterly magazine, called the American Indian, which focuses on a wide range of topics pertaining to Native Americans. It won the Native American Journalists Association's General Excellence awards in 2002 and 2003. The magazine's mission is to: "Celebrate Native Traditions and Communities".

National Native American Veterans Memorial 

The National Native American Veterans Memorial honors American Indian, Alaska Native, and Native Hawaiian veterans who have served in the U.S. Armed Forces during every American conflict since the American Revolution. It was originally authorized by Congress in 1994 with amendments in 2013.

The national memorial was unveiled with a virtual event on Veterans Day 2020, with a dedication ceremony postponed indefinitely due to the COVID-19 pandemic in the United States. It comprises a vertical steel circle standing on a stone drum, surrounded by benches and engravings of the logos of the military branches. Four stainless steel lances are incorporated around the benches where veterans, family members, tribal leaders, and other visitors can tie cloths for prayers and healing.

The memorial was designed by Cheyenne and Arapaho artist Harvey Pratt and is titled Warriors’ Circle of Honor.  Jurors unanimously selected the design concept from among more than 120 submissions.

See also
 
 Always Becoming
 Ben Nighthorse Campbell
 Daniel Inouye
 George Gustav Heye Center
 List of national memorials of the United States
 Live Earth concert, Washington, D.C.
 National Museum of the American Indian Act

References

External links

 Official website
 Photo tour of the National Museum of the American Indian
 A Visitor's Experience: The National Museum of the American Indian
National Museum of the American Indian George Gustav Heye Center

 
American art
Douglas Cardinal buildings
American Indian
Members of the Cultural Alliance of Greater Washington
Museums established in 2004
Museums of American art
National Mall
Native American arts organizations
Native American magazines
Native American museums in New York (state)
Native American museums in Washington, D.C.
American Indian
2004 establishments in Washington, D.C.
Southwest Federal Center
American Indian
American Indian